Amenra is a Belgian band from Kortrijk. It was formed in 1999 by vocalist Colin H. van Eeckhout and guitarist Mathieu Vandekerckhove, who now perform alongside drummer Bjorn Lebon, guitarist Lennart Bossu and bassist Tim De Gieter. Among a number of other works, they have released six studio albums in the Mass series, the latest of them through Neurot Recordings. The band's unique musical style, characterised by brooding atmospheres and spiritual intensity, is rooted in doom metal, hardcore punk and post-rock. Their live performances, accompanied by visual art, have been described as "entrancing communions". In 2005, Amenra formed Church of Ra, a collective of collaborating artists which now includes Oathbreaker and the Black Heart Rebellion.

History

Amenra was formed in 1999 in the West Flanders city of Kortrijk. The band was founded by vocalist Colin H. van Eeckhout, lead guitarist Mathieu Vandekerckhove and bassist Kristof Mondy. The three had been in the hardcore punk band Spineless that split up in 1999 and wanted to create music with more "heart and soul".

The group released their debut studio album Mass I in 2003. Van Eeckhout suggested in 2017 that each Mass is created out of necessity to reflect on a certain experience or phase in the band members' lives and thus they never know which album will be their last. He also described 2005's Mass III as a "keystone moment of [Amenra's] existence" at which they "found direction". The band's next "turning point" came when they joined Neurot Records to release Mass V. The label was founded by Neurosis; a band that has been influential in Amenra's style and career. Produced by Billy Anderson, Mass V has received moderately positive reviews from critics.

In August 2021, professional wrestler Malakai Black began using Amenra's song Ogentroost as his entrance theme in All Elite Wrestling.

Style

Sound
Amenra's musical style has been described as post-metal, sludge, post-hardcore, doom and ethereal hardcore. It has also been noted to bear a resemblance to black metal, gothic folk and post-rock. Remfry Dedman of The Independent wrote that their "avant-garde post-metal" music "push[es] the boundaries of extreme music by being heavy in practically every conceivable way; sonically, emotionally and spiritually."

Themes and artistry
Though calling himself agnostic, Colin H. van Eeckhout acknowledges the presence of spirituality and religion in the band's work. Shortly before the release of Mass VI, he wrote for The Independent:

We have one story to tell and it is always the same. I always write about life’s pain. I always use personal experiences as a reference to relate as truthfully and as honestly possible, from the heart. I try to bend the darkness into the light. ... From the beginning, our intention with the Mass albums was to devise a platform for self-reflection, to set a base for introspection; that moment when you’re on your knees and you ask questions that don’t have answers.

Amenra often collaborate with visual artists and choreographers, including Willy Vanderperre and Berlinde De Bruyckere.

Sideprojects and Church of Ra
Around the release of Mass III in 2005, Amenra founded a collective of like-minded artists named Church of Ra. It includes friends who share a DIY ethic, collaborating on various artistic projects. In a 2014 interview, van Eeckhout traced the development of the collective: 
We started working together in different projects with Amenra and sideprojects Kingdom [including van Eeckhout and Vandekerckhove], Syndrome [Vandekerckhove's solo project], etc. When Lennart Bossu [of the band Firestone] (guitars) and Levy Seynaeve [of the band Black Haven] (bass) joined Amenra, Oathbreaker [including Bossu] and Hessian [Seynaeve] got formed. We worked together with Tomas Lootens and Valentijn Goethals from Webecameaware for layouts artwork etc, they are also in The Black Heart Rebellion. Treha Sektori from Paris also works with us a lot. I started talking to him in 2009, and soon thereafter we formed Sembler Deah [van Eeckhout, Vandekerckhove]. New projects CHVE [van Eeckhout's solo project], Harlowe [van Eeckhout, Bossu], Caan [van Eeckhout, Vandekerckhove], Darak [van Eeckhout, Vandekerckhove], Wiegedood [Oathbreaker members] are being formed. Through the years photographers like Stefaan Temmerman, Jeroen Mylle, Thomas Sweertvaegher worked with us as well, dancer choreographer Thomas Steyaert, visual artist/graphic designer Tine Guns and so much more.
One recurring musician in the collective is Tim Bryon, the drummer of Kingdom, Hessian, and the Black Heart Rebellion. In 2015, Vandekerckhove formed Absent in Body with Scott Kelly of Neurosis, joined in 2016 by van Eeckhout; they released one single, "The Abyss Stares Back - Vol. V", in 2017. In 2020, van Eeckhout and Bossu released the single "A Faint Young Sun" with techno DJ Gianmarco Cellini, as Eyes of Another. In 2021, Caro Tanghe of Oathbreaker joined Amenra and contributed vocals to the album De Doorn.

Members
Current members
 Colin H. van Eeckhout – vocals (1999–present)
 Mathieu J. Vandekerckhove  – guitars (1999–present)
 Bjorn J. Lebon – drums (2003–present)
 Lennart Bossu – guitars (2008–present)
 Tim De Gieter – bass (2020–present)

Former members
 Kristof J. Mondy – bass (1999–2006)
 Vincent F. Tetaert – guitars (2003–2008)
 Maarten Kinet – bass (2006–2012)
 Levy Seynaeve – bass (2012–2020)
 Caro Tanghe – vocals (2021)

Timeline

Discography

Studio albums
 Mass III (2005)
 Mass IIII (2008)
 Mass V (2012)
 Mass VI (2017)
 De Doorn (2021)

EPs
 Mass I: Prayer I-VI (2003)
 Prayers 9+10 12" (2004)
 Mass II: Sermons (2005)
 Afterlife 10" + CD (2009)
 Het Dorp / De Zotte Morgen (2020)

Live albums 
 Live (2012)
 Live II (2014)
 Alive (2016)
 Mass VI Live (2020)
 Acoustic Live (Vivid) (2020)

Splits
 Vuur / Amenra 7" (2004)
 Vuur / Amenra / Gameness / Gantz CD (2004)
 Amenra / Hitch 7" (2007)
 Amenra / Hive Destruction 10" (2011)
 Amenra / The Black Heart Rebellion 12" (2011)
 Amenra / Oathbreaker 7" (2011)
 Amenra / Hessian 7" (2012)
 Amenra / Madensuyu 10" (2014)
 Amenra / VVOVNDS 12" (2014)
 Amenra / Eleanora 10" (2014)
 Amenra / Treha Sektori 10" (2014)
 Amenra / Sofie Verdoodt 7" (2015)
 Amenra / Raketkanon 7" (2017)

Compilations

 The Cradle: Demos (2019)
 A Flood of Light: Soundtrack (2020)

DVDs 
 Mass III (Hypertension Records pre-order special) (2005)
 Church of Ra (2009)
 23.10 (2009)
 01.06 (Fortarock 2013) (2013)
 22.12 (Ancienne Belgique 2012) (2013)

Books 
 Church of Ra (2008)

Singles and music videos 
 "Nowena 9|10" (2012)
 "Boden" (2012)
 "Amonâme" (2014)
 "Charon" (2016)
 "Children of the Eye" (2017)
 "A Solitary Reign" (2017)
 "Trahn" (2020)
 "The Summoning" (with Kreng) (2020)
 "Song to the Siren" (Tim Buckley cover) (2021)
 "De Evenmens" (2021)
 "Voor Immer" (2021)
 "Day is Done" (2021) (Nick Drake cover) (2021)

References

External links

 Amenra at Neurot Recordings

Post-metal musical groups
Sludge metal musical groups
Post-hardcore groups
Doom metal musical groups
Belgian heavy metal musical groups
Belgian hardcore punk groups
Belgian post-rock groups
People from Kortrijk
1999 establishments in Belgium
Musical groups established in 1999
Hypertension Records artists